

Incumbents
Monarch: Felipe VI
Prime Minister: Mariano Rajoy

Events
February 6 - 30th Goya Awards in Madrid
April 9-15 - 2016 IIHF World Championship Division II Group A in Jaca
15 May - After the crash between Lewis Hamilton and Nico Rosberg, Max Verstappen wins the Spanish Grand Prix, marking him F1's youngest ever winner and the first Dutch winner.

Deaths
December 27 - Gloria Begué Cantón, professor, jurist, senator and magistrate (b. 1931)

See also
2016 in Spanish television

References

 
2010s in Spain
Years of the 21st century in Spain
Spain
Spain